Ralf, Rafe or Ralph Martin may refer to:

Sportsmen
William Ralph Martin Leake (1865–1942), English rugby union forward
Ralph Martin Huff (born 1948), American football linebacker
Ralph Martin Treuel (born 1955),  American baseball coach
Ralf Martin (born 1967), German racing driver

Writers
Ralph G. Martin (1920–2013), American political biographer
Ralph P. Martin (1925–2013), English academic and New Testament scholar
David Ralph Martin (1935–2007), English television and film writer
Rafe Martin (born 1946), American writer of children's literature for North Atlantic Books
Ralph C. Martin (born 1942), American Catholic academic and writer since 1960s
Ralph Martin, American journalist and founder in 1997 of CNHI publications

Others
Ralph P. Martin (before 1950—2017), American actor in 1998 film The Dentist 2
Ralph Martin Publicover (born 1952), British diplomat (List of ambassadors of the United Kingdom to Angola)
Ralph Martin, Western Australian Government Astronomer from 2010 to 2013
Ralph Martin, American banjoist (American Banjo Museum Hall of Fame members in 2003)

Characters
Ralph Martin, character in 1933 American film Stage Mother

See also
Martin Ralph (born 1960), Australian Olympic sprint canoer